Mac Davis (January 21, 1942 – September 29, 2020) was an American country music singer, songwriter, and actor. A native of Lubbock, Texas, he enjoyed success as a crossover artist, and during his early career he wrote for Elvis Presley, providing him with the hits "Memories", "In the Ghetto", "Don't Cry Daddy", and "A Little Less Conversation". A subsequent solo career in the 1970s produced hits such as "Baby, Don't Get Hooked on Me". Davis also starred in his own variety show, a Broadway musical, and various films and TV shows.

Biography

Early life 
Davis was born and raised in Lubbock, Texas, the son of Edith Irene (Lankford) and T. J. Davis, a builder. He spent his childhood years with his sister Linda, living and working at the former College Courts, an efficiency apartment complex owned by his father. Davis described his father, who was divorced from Davis' mother, as "very religious, very strict, and very stubborn." Though Davis was physically small, he had a penchant for getting into fistfights. "In those days, it was all about football, rodeo, and fistfights. Oh, man, I got beat up so much while I was growing up in Lubbock," Davis said in a March 2, 2008, interview with the Lubbock Avalanche-Journal newspaper. "I was 5 feet, 9 inches, and weighed 125 pounds. I joined Golden Gloves, but didn't do good even in my division." Davis graduated at 16 from Lubbock High School and, looking to escape his hometown, moved to Atlanta where his mother lived.

Career as a songwriter
Once Davis was settled in Atlanta, he organized a rock and roll group called the Zots, and made two singles for OEK Records, managed and promoted by OEK owner Oscar Kilgo.
 Davis also worked for the Vee Jay record company (home to such R&B stars as Gene Chandler, Jerry Butler, and Dee Clark) as a regional manager and later became a regional manager for Liberty Records.

 
Davis became famous as a songwriter and got his start as an employee of Nancy Sinatra's company, Boots Enterprises, Inc. Davis was with Boots for several years in the late 1960s. During his time there, he played on many of Sinatra's recordings, and she worked him into her stage shows. Boots Enterprises also acted as Davis's publishing company, publishing songs such as "In the Ghetto", "Friend, Lover, Woman, Wife", "Home", "It's Such a Lonely Time of Year", and "Memories", which were recorded by Elvis Presley, Nancy Sinatra, B. J. Thomas and many others. During a short timespan Davis used the pseudonym "Scott Davis" for songwriting purposes (borrowing from the given name of his son) to avoid confusion with renowned songwriter Mack David. Davis left Boots Enterprises in 1970 to sign with Columbia Records, taking all of his songs with him.

One of the songs he wrote in 1968 called "A Little Less Conversation" was recorded by Elvis Presley (and became a posthumous success for Presley years later). Presley also recorded Davis's "In the Ghetto" in sessions in Memphis. Davis eventually recorded the tune after Presley's version became a success, and he released it on a Ronco In Concert compilation in 1975. Presley continued to record more of Davis's material, such as "Memories", "Don't Cry Daddy", and "Clean Up Your Own Backyard". Bobby Goldsboro also recorded some of Davis's songs, including "Watching Scotty Grow", which became a No. 1 Adult Contemporary success for Goldsboro in 1971. Other artists who recorded his material included Vikki Carr, O.C. Smith, and Kenny Rogers and The First Edition. "I Believe in Music", often considered to be Davis's signature song, was recorded by several artists (including Marian Love, B.J. Thomas, Louis Jordan, Perry Como, Helen Reddy, Lynn Anderson, and Davis himself) before it finally became a success in 1972 for the group Gallery.

During the 1970s, many of his songs "crossed over", successfully scoring on both the country and popular music charts, including "Baby, Don't Get Hooked on Me" (a number one Grammy-nominated success), "One Hell of a Woman" (pop no. 11), and "Stop and Smell the Roses" (a no. 9 pop hit). Also, during the 1970s, he was active as an actor, appearing in several movies as well as hosting a successful variety show.
In 2013 he was part of the Los Angeles writing and producing team that created the hit "Young Girls" for Bruno Mars. https://en.wikipedia.org/wiki/Young_Girls#Background_and_writing

Success as a singer 

Davis soon decided to pursue a career of his own in country music; he was signed to Columbia Records in 1970. After several years of enriching the repertoires of other artists, his big success came two years after signing with Columbia. He topped the Country and Pop charts with the song "Baby Don't Get Hooked on Me". It sold over one million copies and was awarded a gold disc by the Recording Industry Association of America in September 1972.

In 1974, Davis was awarded the Academy of Country Music's Entertainer of the Year award. He had other successes including the songs "Stop and Smell the Roses" (a number one Adult Contemporary success in 1974) (pop no. 9), "One Hell of a Woman" (pop no. 11), "Rock 'N' Roll (I Gave You the Best Years of My Life)" (pop no. 15), and "Burnin' Thing" (pop no. 53). At the end of the 1970s, he moved to Casablanca Records, which was best known at the time for its successes with disco star Donna Summer and rock'n'roll band Kiss. His first success for the company in 1980 was the novelty song "It's Hard to Be Humble", a light-hearted look at how popularity and good looks could go to one's head. The song became his first Country music top 10 and a rare top 30 hit in the UK. (It was translated into Dutch as "Het is moeilijk bescheiden te blijven" and became a hit for the Dutch singer Peter Blanker in 1981). Later that year, he had another top 10 song with "Let's Keep It That Way". In November, "Rock 'N' Roll (I Gave You the Best Years of My Life)" was played by KHJ in Los Angeles as its last song before it switched from Top 40 to Country music. He achieved success with other songs like "Texas in My Rear View Mirror" and "Hooked on Music", which became his biggest Country music success in 1981 going to number 2. In 1985, he recorded his last top 10 country music success with the song "I Never Made Love (Till I Made Love With You)".

On January 19, 1985, Davis performed "God Bless the USA" at the 50th Presidential Inaugural Gala, held the day before the second inauguration of Ronald Reagan.

Acting career 
From 1974 to 1976, Davis had his own television variety show on NBC, The Mac Davis Show. He made his feature film debut opposite Nick Nolte in the football film North Dallas Forty (1979) and was listed as one of 12 "Promising New Actors of 1979" by Screen World magazine.

Davis also starred in the 1981 comedy film Cheaper To Keep Her, playing a divorced detective who worked for a neurotic feminist attorney. He tracked down husbands who were failing to pay alimony to their ex-wives to fund his own alimony payments for his own ex-wife. The film received mainly negative reviews and was not a box-office success.

In 1980, Davis hosted an episode of The Muppet Show. He performed "Baby, Don't Get Hooked On Me", "It's Hard To Be Humble", and "I Believe in Music".

In 1983, he appeared in The Sting II, as Jake Hooker, a younger relative of Johnny Hooker, portrayed by Robert Redford in The Sting.

Davis played Will Rogers in the Broadway production of The Will Rogers Follies and in its national tour.

In 1998, Davis starred in the sports comedy Possums, which debuted at the Sundance Film Festival.
Davis served as the balladeer for the 2000 telefilm The Dukes of Hazzard: Hazzard in Hollywood, replacing Don Williams, who had served the part in 1997's The Dukes of Hazzard: Reunion! and Waylon Jennings, who narrated the original Dukes of Hazzard television show. Davis was the first balladeer to appear on-screen to welcome the audience and provide exposition.
Davis was inducted into the Nashville Songwriters Hall of Fame in 2000. He was awarded a star symbol on the Hollywood Walk of Fame, located at 7080 Hollywood Boulevard, for his contribution to the recording industry.

In 2001, Davis played a fellow karaoke competitor to Jon Gries's Sunny Holiday in the Polish brothers' film Jackpot. In the film, a dispute began between Sunny's manager, played by Garrett Morris, and Davis's character about what song he should sing. The manager suggested Davis's "Baby, Don't Get Hooked On Me", which Davis's character claimed just was not him.

From 2001 to 2003, Davis voiced the character of Barber Bingo on two episodes of the animated TV series Oswald; "Henry Needs A Haircut" and "The Naughty Cat".

Between 1999 and 2006, Davis provided the character voices of Sheriff Buford (two episodes) and a talk radio host named "Sports Jock" (three episodes), on the animated series King of the Hill.

Davis also guest-starred briefly in the 8 Simple Rules episode "Let's Keep Going: Part 2" in April 2004.

He had a recurring role as Rodney Carrington's father-in-law in the sitcom Rodney.

Personal life and death 
Davis was married three times, his marriages producing three children:
Fran Cook: 1963–1968 (divorced; one son, Joel Scott)
Sarah Barg: 1971–1976 (divorced)
Lise Kristen Gerard: 1982–2020 (his death; two children, Noah Claire and Cody Luke)

At 21, he married Fran Cook from Georgia. Their son, Joel Scott, was born a year later; Davis shifted from playing in rock bands to learning the music business while working in Liberty Records' publishing division. The Liberty job got him to Los Angeles and made it easier to "pitch his own tunes" to record producers. Davis commented, "One day Fran decided to do her own thing and she wanted me to do mine." They divorced and she went back to Atlanta.

Davis next met Sarah Barg, then 16 and living in his apartment building with her mother. Two years later, they were married. "We talked about having a family, but I was waiting for her to grow up," he says. She left him in 1976 for Glen Campbell, with whom she then had one child, Dillon. She also left Campbell shortly after Dillon's birth.

In 1980, Davis started to date a young nurse, Lise Gerard. They married in 1982 when she was 24, and they had two children. They remained happily married until Davis' death at age 78 on September 29, 2020, following heart surgery.

Discography

Filmography

Television

References

Bibliography
Wolff, Kurt. The Rough Guide to Country Music. Penguin Publishing.

External links

Nashvillesongwritersfoundation.com
Songwritershalloffame.org
Interview with Mac Davis
[ Mac Davis biography at Allmusic]

1942 births
2020 deaths
American country rock singers
American country singer-songwriters
American male film actors
American male singer-songwriters
Place of birth missing
American male stage actors
Jamie Records artists
Lubbock High School alumni
People from Lubbock, Texas
Singer-songwriters from Texas
Vee-Jay Records artists
Country musicians from Texas